Angra dos Reis (Portuguese for cove or bay of the Kings) is a Brazilian municipality located in the southern part of the state of Rio de Janeiro. The city is located by the sea and includes in its territory many offshore islands, the largest being Ilha Grande.

The area was first documented by Europeans on January 6, 1502, and has been under continual settlement since 1556. Its population was estimated, on 2021 by IBGE, to be 210,171 inhabitants.

History
The port municipality fell into decline after 1872, having been bypassed by the advent of railways. It came back into prominence in the 1920s, when a railway extension connected it to the states of Minas Gerais and Goias, as a terminus for the transportation of agriculture production from these same two states. The railway extension, in metre gauge, still exists and is currently operated by the Ferrovia Centro-Atlântica company.

In the mid-twentieth century, the municipality was an essential part of the implementation of Companhia Siderúrgica Nacional – CSN, Volta Redonda, and the endpoint for coking coal supplied from Santa Catarina. Today, the same company also uses the port for some of its steel exports.

Its current importance is due, in part, to having a ferry terminal facility in the Bay of Ilha Grande and its harbour, used by TEBIG Petrobras, which transports large quantities of crude oil, and thus positions the port of Angra dos Reis as one of the busiest in the country.

Today, because of its beaches and nearby points of interest, the place has become a focal point for tourism. Within the municipality are over three hundred islands, many of them owned by celebrities, with the largest island being Ilha Grande (Big Island). The Brazilian plastic surgeon and philanthropist Ivo Pitanguy was a noted resident.

Most of the region consists of hilly terrain, which helped generate the landslides that occurred at the beginning of 2010, when numerous homes and hotels were severely damaged or destroyed, mainly on Ilha Grande.

Economy 
The most important economic activities are commerce, fishing, industry, services, and tourism. The port has an oil terminal as well as shipbuilding (Keppel Fels, former Verolme) facilities. Brazil's nuclear power stations, Angra I and Angra II  are located nearby. They employ 3,000 people, and generate another 10,000 indirect jobs in Rio de Janeiro State. Tourism is highly developed, with beaches, islands and clean waters for swimming or scuba diving. The nuclear power stations also warm the area's waters with their thermal discharges, a form of thermal pollution.

There is a small amount of cattle raising, with approximately 4,200 head. The main agricultural products cultivated are:
bananas: 1,460 hectares / 3,600 tons
coconut: 10 hectares / 130,000 units
oranges: 4 hectares / 25 tons
hearts of palm (palmito): 50 hectares / 75 tons
sugarcane: 20 hectares / 390 tons
Data are from IBGE

Etymology

Gaspar de Lemos, a navigator and commander of the Portuguese naval fleet landed at Ilha Grande on 6 January 1502, a “Kings’ day” – that is, “Dia de Reis”. Accordingly, the place was named “Angra dos Reis”, which means “Creek of the Kings” or loosely – “Anchorage of the Kings”.

Transportation 
The city is served by Angra dos Reis Airport.

Geography

Location

Angra dos Reis has an area of 816.3 km². The neighboring municipalities are Paraty, Rio Claro and Mangaratiba in Rio de Janeiro state, and Bananal and São José do Barreiro, which are adjacent in São Paulo state.

The municipality contains the  Ilha Grande State Park, created in 1971 on the Ilha Grande off the southern coast.
It contains the  Praia do Sul Biological Reserve, a strictly protected conservation unit created in 1981 on the Ilha Grande.
It contains the  Aventureiro Sustainable Development Reserve, formerly the Aventureiro Marine State Park, also on Ilha Grande.
The municipality also contains part of the Tamoios Ecological Station.
The conservation units are contained within the  Tamoios Environmental Protection Area, created in 1982.

Climate

According to Köppen climate classification, Angra dos Reis has a tropical rainforest climate (Af).

References

External links

 Angra dos Reis
 Angra dos Reis (Portuguese)
 Angra dos Reis (Portuguese)
 Angra dos Reis (Portuguese)

Populated coastal places in Rio de Janeiro (state)
Populated places established in 1556
1556 establishments in the Portuguese Empire
Municipalities in Rio de Janeiro (state)